Novosphingobium taihuense  is a bacterium from the genus Novosphingobium which has been isolated from lake sediments from the Taihu Lake in China. Novosphingobium taihuense has the ability to degrade phenol, aniline, nitrobenzene, 4-chloronitrobenzene and phenanthrene.

References

External links
Type strain of Novosphingobium taihuense at BacDive -  the Bacterial Diversity Metadatabase

Bacteria described in 2005
Sphingomonadales